Thießen is a village and a former municipality in the district of Wittenberg, Saxony-Anhalt, Germany. Since 1 September 2010, it is part of the town Coswig.

Copper hammer mill 
Thießen copper hammer mill (Kupferhammer Thießen) is an industrial monument and the only copper hammer mill in Saxony-Anhalt. It lies in a park, roughly 1 hectare in area. The Rossel stream, which flows through the park, is impounded above the mill into a hammer pond, part of which drains freely, but part of which is used to drive the water wheels of the mill.

References

Former municipalities in Saxony-Anhalt
Coswig, Saxony-Anhalt